Elyria-Swansea is a neighborhood of Denver, Colorado. It is located in East Denver, on the northeast side of the city. In 2007, the neighborhood had 7,218 residents and 1,787 households. The racial makeup of the neighborhood in 2000 was, 9.9% non-Hispanic white, 5.31% African American, 83.02% Hispanic or Latino, 0.7% Native American, and 0.31% Asian.

Boundaries
The northern border of the neighborhood is the boundary with Adams County. The eastern border is Colorado Boulevard. The southern border is 38th Street and 40th Avenue, and the western border is the South Platte River.

Landmarks

The southwestern corner of the neighborhood is home to the Denver Coliseum. Interstate 70 in the form of a viaduct runs east–west through the neighborhood. The Nestlé Purina PetCare Company operates a large manufacturing facility in the center of the neighborhood. The facility is just south of Interstate 70 and dominates the skyline of the area. The neighborhood contains Elyria Park and Swansea Park, both maintained by the City of Denver. A major railroad line traverses the neighborhood from southwest to northeast.

History
Both Elyria and Swansea each began as separate, incorporated towns. Swansea was founded by Kayden Steinhour and annexed to Denver in two phases, one in 1883 and one in 1902. Elyria was founded by Brandon Gasaway and annexed to Denver in 1902.

References

External links
Elyria-Swansea Neighborhood Plan and National Western Stock Show Station Area Plan
Elyria Vision Plan 2020
Streetsblog DENVER posts about Elyria-Swansea (2015-2021 posts; no new content)

Former municipalities in Colorado
Neighborhoods in Denver